John Fowler (by 1520 – c. 1575), of London, was an English Member of Parliament and courtier.

He was a Member of Parliament (MP) for New Shoreham in March 1553, Hythe in 1555, Winchelsea in 1558, Weymouth in 1559, and  West Looe in 1563. Fowler was heavily involved in helping Thomas Seymour, 1st Baron Seymour of Sudeley attempt to influence Seymour's nephew, Edward VI of England, as Fowler was a Groom of the Privy Chamber to the boy king.

References

1570s deaths
Politicians from London
English MPs 1553 (Edward VI)
Year of birth uncertain
English MPs 1555
English MPs 1558
English MPs 1559
English MPs 1563–1567
Members of the pre-1707 English Parliament for constituencies in Cornwall